Plantago leiopetala is a herbaceous perennial, caulescent with a thick woody, white pubescent stem up to 6 cm in height, bearing the bases of old petioles and scapes. Lanceolate, glabrous or glabrescent leaves up to 21 cm in length, borne in rosette at end of stem. Spikes, 1–3 cm, supported by scapes, 30 cm in length. Flowers with generally glabrous sepals, sometimes shortly villous above, corolla-lobes 2.1–3 mm. Flowers from March to July.

Distribution
A rare plant endemic to the islands of Madeira and Porto Santo. It inhabits cliffs and rocky slopes on the north coast of Madeira from São Jorge west to Porto do Moniz and on higher peaks and rocky areas of Porto Santo.

Gallery

References

External links

leiopetala
Flora of Madeira
Endemic flora of Madeira
Endemic flora of Macaronesia
Plants described in 1853
Taxa named by Richard Thomas Lowe